DeKalb Township is one of nineteen townships in DeKalb County, Illinois, USA. As of the 2010 census, its population was 46,781 and it contained 18,006 housing units. DeKalb Township was originally named Orange Township, but was renamed on November 20, 1850.

Geography

Cities, towns, villages
 Dekalb (mostly)
 Sycamore (southwest corner)

Cemeteries

 Evergreen
 Fairview Park
 Oaklawn
 Pleasant Street
 St Mary's Catholic DeKalb
  Whitmore

Airports and landing strips
 Hoffman Airport
 Kishwaukee Comm Health Heliport

Demographics

School districts
 DeKalb Community Unit School District 428
 Sycamore Community Unit School District 427

Political districts
 Illinois's 14th congressional district
 State House District 70
 State Senate District 35

References
 
 US Census Bureau 2009 TIGER/Line Shapefiles
 US National Atlas

External links
 City-Data.com
 Illinois State Archives
 Township Officials of Illinois
 DeKalb County Official Site

Townships in DeKalb County, Illinois
Populated places established in 1850
Townships in Illinois